Edward Lee "Eddie" Lewis (born December 15, 1953) is a former professional American football defensive back in the National Football League. He played college football for the Kansas Jayhawks. Lewis was selected by the San Francisco 49ers in the 2nd round (57th overall pick) of the 1976 NFL Draft. He played five seasons for the San Francisco 49ers (1976–1979) and the Detroit Lions (1979–1980).

Early life

References

1953 births
Living people
Sportspeople from Mobile, Alabama
Players of American football from Alabama
American football cornerbacks
Kansas Jayhawks football players
San Francisco 49ers players
Detroit Lions players